Louis Brody (born Ludwig M'bebe Mpessa; 15 February 1896 – 11 February 1951) was a Cameroonian-born German film actor, musician and showfighter.

Brody was born in Douala, in the German colony of Kamerun, now Cameroon. His career began in the 1920s after he moved to Germany and lasted uninterrupted throughout the Nazi regime till his death in 1951. Brody engaged also in political work in favour of Afro-Germans as part of the African Aid Organisation, established by and for Afro-Germans living in Germany. In 1938 he married a woman from Danzig. Brody remained active and successful as an artist during World War II.

Selected filmography 
 (1915) as the Black African (film debut)
The Mistress of the World (1919) as Mallkalle the medicine man/Simba the Chinese servant
The Dagger of Malaya (1919) as Jack Johnson
 Genuine (1920) as the Malay
 Destiny (1921) as the Moor
 The Pearl of the Orient (1921) as the Rajah's servant
 The Conspiracy in Genoa (1921) as Mulay Hassan
 The Secret of Bombay (1921)
 The Poisoned Stream (1921)
 The Island of the Lost (1921) as the king of the island
 The Indian Tomb (1921) as the Maharadjah's black servant (uncredited)
 The Man Without a Name (1921) as Bill Burns
 The Secret of Santa Maria (1921)
 Der Kleine Muck (1921) as Achmet
 Lust for Life (1922) as Jimmy
 Das Spielzeug einer Tänzerin (1923) as Brutus
 The Pleasure Garden (1925) as the plantation manager (uncredited)
 The Boxer's Bride (1926) as Fighting Bob
 I Once Had a Comrade (1926) as the Moor
 The Armoured Vault (1926) as the chauffeur
 The Great Duchess (1926)
 Mata Hari (1927)
 Death Drive for the World Record (1929) as Salto King's servant
 The Last Testament (1929)
 Calais-Dover (1931) as the cook
 No More Love (1931) as the cook
 The White Demon (1932) as the theater porter
 Narcotics (1932) as the theater porter (uncredited)
 Peter Voss, Thief of Millions (1932) as the Pascha's servant
 The Flower of Hawaii (1933)
 Hard Luck Mary (1934) as the black man
 Pechmarie (1934) as the black man
 The Riders of German East Africa (1934) as Hamissi
 Punks Arrives from America (1935) as the barkeeper
 Pillars of Society (1935) as a cowboy
 La Habanera (1937) as a Puerto Rican passerby
 The Mystery of Betty Bonn (1938) as Seaman Higgins
 Sergeant Berry (1938) as Berry's neighbor
 The Impossible Mister Pitt (1938) as Seaman Hannibal
 Kennwort Machin (1939) as the New York hotel porter
 Water for Canitoga (1939) as Johnny
 (1939)
 Goodbye, Franziska (1941) as the South American hotel porter (uncredited)
 Jud Süß (1940) as the Duke's black valet
 Carl Peters (1941) as the East African tribal chief
 Ohm Kruger (1941) as Lobenguela
 Blutsbrüderschaft (1941)
 Vom Schicksal verweht (1942) as the tribal chief
 Doctor Crippen (1942) as Pedro
  (1942) as Je-Crois-En-Dieu
 Münchhausen (1943) as Abd al-Hamid's servant (uncredited)
  (1943) as King Wapunga
 Kolberg (1945) as a Black French soldier (uncredited)
 Peter Voss, Thief of Millions (1946)
 Quax in Africa (1947) as the medicine man
 Nights on the Nile (1949) as the Egyptian
 The Black Forest Girl (1950) as a party guest (uncredited)
 The Last Year (1951)

References

External links 

1892 births
1952 deaths
20th-century German male actors
German male silent film actors
German male film actors
People from Douala
Cameroonian male actors
Cameroonian emigrants to Germany